Rinorea endotricha is a species of plant in the Violaceae family. It is found in Guyana and Venezuela.

References

endotricha
Near threatened plants
Taxonomy articles created by Polbot